Marlon D. Amprey (born January 24, 1987) is a member of the Maryland House of Delegates. Amprey represents District 40 in the west and southwest parts of the city of Baltimore.

Early life
Marlon D. Amprey graduated from University of Maryland, College Park in 2009 with a Bachelor of Arts in American government and politics. Amprey graduated in 2011 with a Master of Education in elementary education and curriculum from George Mason University. He then graduated in 2016 with a J.D. from the University of Pennsylvania Law School. He also received a certificate in business management in Wharton School, University of Pennsylvania in 2016. He was admitted to the Maryland State Bar.

Amprey is married.

Career
Amprey was a teacher for Howard Road Academy Public Charter School, a school in Washington, D.C., from 2009 to 2011. He was a member of Teach For America during this period. Amprey was a 6th grade teacher at The SEED School of Maryland from 2011 to 2013. During law school, Amprey served as a congressional intern for the late Congressman Elijah Cummings.

Amprey then worked as a corporate associate at Venable LLC from 2016 to 2019. He worked as an associate of DLA Piper from 2019 to 2020 and an associate at Cole Scholtz P.C. starting in 2020. He has served as the director of Patterson Park Public Charter School and Code in the Schools since 2016.

Amprey was appointed by Governor Larry Hogan on January 6, 2021, to replace Nick Mosby, who resigned on December 8, 2020.

References

External links

21st-century American politicians
George Mason University alumni
Living people
Democratic Party members of the Maryland House of Delegates
University of Maryland, College Park alumni
University of Pennsylvania Law School alumni
Wharton School of the University of Pennsylvania alumni
1987 births
Teach For America alumni